The Voice of Finland (season 5) was the fifth season of the Finnish reality singing competition based on The Voice format. The season premiered on Nelonen on January 8, 2016. The live final aired on April 22, 2016.

The coaches were singer Tarja Turunen, Olli Lindholm, Redrama and Michael Monroe. Axl Smith hosted the program from blind auditions to the knockouts. Heikki Paasonen hosted the live shows.

Teams 
Color Key

Episodes

The Blind Auditions

Episode 1: January 8, 2016

Episode 2: January 14, 2016

Episode 3: January 15, 2016

Episode 4: January 21, 2016

Episode 5: January 22, 2016

Episode 6: January 28, 2016

Episode 7: January 29, 2016

Episode 8: February 4, 2016

Episode 9: February 5, 2016

Episode 10: February 11, 2016

Battle rounds
During battle rounds, coaches divide contestants to pairs and give them a song to perform. Coach then choose a winner to continue to the Knock Out phase. The losing contestant can still be stolen by another coach, as each coach can make one steal. Each coach is also joined by an adviser, with Michael Monroe being joined by Sami Yaffa from Hanoi Rocks, Olli Lindholm by singer Suvi Teräsniska, Tarja Turunen by Timo Kotipelto from Stratovarius, and Redrama by producer/songwriter MGI.

Colour key

Episode 11: February 12, 2016

Episode 12: February 18, 2016

Episode 13: February 19, 2016

Episode 14: February 25, 2016

Episode 15: February 26, 2016

Episode 16: March 3, 2016

The Knockouts
For the knockouts, coaches group their contestants in pairs, or trios with the artist stolen during the Battle phase. This season, the coaches can steal one losing artist. Each night three coaches bring their artists on stage, and one coach watches all performances and eliminations and gives his/her choice from the losing artists in the end. The top 16 contestants will then move on to the live shows.

Color key:

Live shows
Live shows began on March 25. At the end of each live show one singer from each team was eliminated. The public had the chance to vote for the contestants performing each night one week before and during the show, either by phone or by watching the official voting videos from their previous performances at Nelonen's Ruutu.fi website. It is also possible to buy votes for one's favorite singer. The live shows were aired on Friday at 8 PM EET from Logomo, Turku.

Colour key

Live 1 (March 25)
The first live show featured a group performance of "You're the Voice" by the singers from all four teams, and a performance by guest artist Kasmir ("Amen").

Live 2 (April 1)
The Voice of Finland alumn Evelina and rapper Mikael Gabriel performed on the second live show ("Honey"/"Helium").

Live 3 (April 8)
All four teams started the show off by paying tribute to recently passed music greats with group performances: Redrama's team to Maurice White ("In the Stone"),  Olli Lindholm's team to Glenn Frey ("Tequila Sunrise"), Tarja Turunen's team to David Bowie ("Let's Dance"), and Michael Monroe's team to Lemmy Kilmister ("Ace of Spades").

Semifinal (April 15)
The Voice of Finland winner from season 4, Miia Kosunen opened the show with her new single, "Kauneinta mitä mä tein". Also the finalist from The Voice of Finland season 1, Jesse Kaikuranta performed his new single "Takki auki tuulessa".

Competition performances

Semifinal results

Final (April 22)
The final show was opened with an instrumental tribute to recently passed music legend Prince ("Purple Rain"). The guest performers of the night were Andra Day ("Rise Up") and Lauri Tähkä ("Morsian").
Competition performances
Each finalist performed an original song and a duet with their team coach. 

Final results

 – Winner
 – Runner-up
 – 3rd/4th place

Elimination Chart

Overall

Color key
Artist's info

Result details

Reception and TV ratings
The Voice of Finland airs twice a week, on Thursday and Friday evenings at 8:00 pm. The program didn't air on Friday, March 11, due to the Emma Awards show live broadcast. Only the higher rating for the week is given.

Notes
Rating is the average number of viewers during the program.
The latest weekly ratings contain timeshift viewing only during the same day. Older weekly ratings contain timeshift viewing during seven days.

References

External links
The Voice of Finland Official website

5
2016 Finnish television seasons